Stock is a village and civil parish in south Essex, England. The village is in the borough of Chelmsford and in the parliamentary constituency of Maldon.

The village
The village has three churches: the Church of England parish church of All Saints, the Catholic Church of Our Lady and St Joseph and Christ Church (Free).

There are three pubs in the village: The Bear, The Hoop, and The Baker's Arms and two other pubs on the outskirts, the Ship near West Hanningfield and the King's Head near Billericay and Buttsbury. There is a post office and general store, a tapas restaurant and Coffee shop. There is a hotel, bar and restaurant called the Harvard.

There is a Church of England primary school, which is rated as "good" by Ofsted.

Transport
The village has a direct link to the A12 trunk road via the B1007. There are bus services to Chelmsford, Lakeside, Wickford and Basildon.

History
The origins of the village are uncertain and are subject to debate. Archaeological finds suggest that during the Iron Age period there was a settlement on the site. The Domesday Book of 1086 does not mention Stock.

The first documentary evidence of the settlement dates from the 13th century. Until the 16th century the village was known as Hereward Stock/Stoke, or variations thereof.

Formerly half of the village was in the parish of Buttsbury and the parish had within its boundaries a hamlet which was a detached part of Orsett. Both of these anomalies have now been resolved.

Notable residents
The poet William Cowper (pronounced Cooper) was a friend of Willam Unwin, who was the rector from 1769 to 1787. The Cowper poem that is most closely connected with Stock is Tithing Time at Stock or the Yearly Distress.

Admiral Sir Vernon Haggard lived in the village.

References

External links

 The Village of Stock in Essex

 
Villages in Essex
Civil parishes in Essex